Holic or Holics may refer to:

 Holíč, a town in western Slovakia
 -holic, a suffix for addiction
 xxxHolic (pronounced Holic), a Japanese manga series by Clamp

See also
 Holice (disambiguation)